Michael Van Wijk (born 30 September 1952) is an Indian-born English bodybuilder, professional sportsperson, actor and TV presenter. He is most well known for his role as Wolf on British TV endurance sports game show Gladiators, a role he held for all its eight series (1992–1999).

Career 
Van Wijk used to run a gym in Hayes in Bromley, London originally called Matrix and later 'Wolf's Fitness Centre'. It was open until the late 1990s and included facilities geared towards bodybuilders, boxers and general fitness.

In 1987 Michael Van Wijk was chosen to be the cover star to Palace Software's computer game Barbarian: The Ultimate Warrior.

In 1989, Van Wijk auditioned for a role in Dances with Wolves. He was unsuccessful but the experience provided him with the inspiration for his ‘Wolf’ persona.

In October 1994, he played one match for the reserve team of Gillingham F.C., playing for 73 minutes in a match against Cambridge United's reserves before going off injured. The match attracted a crowd ten times the average for the club's reserve team games.

After being missing from British television screens for nine years, Van Wijk told Loaded magazine in April 2008, "I want to come back, I want to be a Gladiator again." Loaded sent a journalist from London to Wolf's home in Henderson, Auckland, to persuade the actor to return to England to appear in the new series. According to the Loaded article, today, Van Wijk, 60, is a regular on the Kiwi Cage Fighting scene, and used to compete nationally in Brazilian Jiu Jitsu championships. He is a twice silver medallist competing against fighters half of his age for the New Zealand title.

Most recently he appeared on the Gladiators Legends Special where he took part in alongside Ace, Hunter and Trojan.

After Gladiators ended Van Wijk moved to New Zealand and opened a chain of gyms.

Filmography
 Salome's Last Dance (1988)
 The Bruce (1996)

References

External links
 

1952 births
Living people
English bodybuilders
British male television actors
British television presenters
Gillingham F.C. players
Male actors from Mumbai
Gladiators (1992 British TV series)
British people of Dutch descent
Association footballers not categorized by position
English footballers